The Kitchener Public Library is the public library system for the city of Kitchener, Ontario, Canada. It consists of five libraries; a large Central Library in the downtown core, with four Community Libraries spread out to provide services for the neighbourhoods of Kitchener.

History
The main branch of the Kitchener Public Library opened at 85 Queen Street in May 1962. Its origins date back to the Mechanics Institute first established in 1854, that grew within the first year to nearly 1,000 books in German and English. The collection, maintained by membership fees and private subscriptions, was destroyed by fire in the 1860s and was replaced in 1871 by a library located on the first floor of the town hall. The Berlin Public Library was officially formed in 1884 following the passing of the Free Libraries Act two years prior.

The present library replaced the Berlin Public Library which originally opened in 1884 with a collection of 2,855 volumes on the first floor of the town hall. The Berlin Public Library was moved when it became a Carnegie library, opening on January 8, 1904, which was located at Queen and Weber. Mabel Dunham served as Chief Librarian at the new location from 1908 to 1944. The Carnegie library was demolished following the opening of the Queen Street location in 1962.

Expansion
In 2010 the main branch underwent a $40 million 25,000-square-foot expansion. Completed in 2013, the project increased floor space by 30% (from around 82,000 square feet to 107,000 square feet), and made the entire building wheelchair accessible. Designed by Levitt Goodman Architects, the building was awarded a 2015 Library Architectural and Design Transformation award by the Ontario Library Association.

In 2015 the Kitchener Public Library became the first library in Canada to lend out internet Hotspots.

Services
 Information and reference services 
 Access to full text databases 
 Community information 
 Internet and computer access 
 Virtual reality booth at the Central location
 Free wifi at all locations
 Free wifi hotspots available to borrow
 Reader's advisory services 
 Programs for children, youth and adults 
 Live music performances
 Delivery to homebound individuals
 Interlibrary loan
 Free downloadable e-books
 Free downloadable audiobooks
 Free downloadable music
 Free livestream movies and TV programs
 Art gallery featuring local artists at the Central location
 Musical instrument lending program

Branches
The Kitchener Public Library system consists of a Central Library in the downtown core, and four Community Library locations throughout the City. The Central Library was completely renovated and expanded in 2014.

See also

Ask Ontario
Ontario Public Libraries

References

External links
Library Board

Public libraries in Ontario
Buildings and structures in Kitchener, Ontario
Carnegie libraries in Canada
Education in Kitchener, Ontario